"Holding On" is a song by British electronic music duo Disclosure. It features the vocals from Gregory Porter. It was released worldwide on 26 May 2015 as the lead single from the duo's second studio album, Caracal. The track premiered on 26 May 2015 as BBC Radio 1 DJ Annie Mac's Hottest Record in the World. The track was written by Howard Lawrence, Porter and Jimmy Napes. The track peaked at number 13 in the UK iTunes chart but only managed to reach number 46 in the UK Singles Chart.

Track listing
Digital download
"Holding On" (featuring Gregory Porter) – 5:15

Digital download – The Remixes and 12" remix EP
"Holding On" (Julio Bashmore Elevated mix) – 6:33
"Holding On" (Pomo remix) – 3:28
"Holding On" (Melé remix) – 4:54
"Holding On" (Armand Van Helden dub mix) – 4:58
"Holding On" (Gus Pirelli VIP 7" disco mix) – 3:12

Charts

Weekly charts

Year-end charts

Release history

See also
 List of number-one dance singles of 2015 (U.S.)

References

Disclosure (band) songs
2015 singles
2015 songs
Island Records singles
Songs written by Jimmy Napes
Songs written by Guy Lawrence
Songs written by Howard Lawrence